"Rock and Roll Is Here to Stay" is a song written by David White and first recorded by his group, Danny & the Juniors. Released in January 1958 by ABC-Paramount Records as the follow-up to the group's #1 hit "At the Hop", it reached #19 on the Billboard Hot 100 and #16 R&B.

The song—with its lyrics of "Rock and roll is here to stay / It will never die"—was originally written in response to attacks on rock and roll music by some conservative radio stations, including KWK in St. Louis, that included the smashing of "undesirable" rock and roll records. It has subsequently been recorded by many other artists, including Sha Na Na (1969) (who later performed it in the 1978 film Grease as "Johnny Casino and the Gamblers"), as well as in the 1983 horror film Christine, and Showaddywaddy (2002).

References

External links
 Lyrics at Genius

1958 singles
1958 songs
Danny & the Juniors songs
Doo-wop songs
Songs about rock music
Songs written by David White (musician)